László Lugossy (born 23 October 1939) is a Hungarian film director.

In 1976, his film Man Without a Name was entered into the 26th Berlin International Film Festival, where it won the Silver Bear for an outstanding single achievement. In 1981 he was a member of the jury at the 12th Moscow International Film Festival.

His 1981 film Köszönöm, megvagyunk was entered into the 31st Berlin International Film Festival. The following year he was a member of the jury at the 32nd Berlin International Film Festival. In 1985, his film Flowers of Reverie won the Silver Bear - Special Jury Prize at the 35th Berlin International Film Festival.

Selected filmography
 Man Without a Name (1976)
 Köszönöm, megvagyunk (1981)
 Flowers of Reverie (1985)

References

External links

1939 births
Living people
Hungarian film directors
Film people from Budapest